The Dhudhuroa people (or Duduroa) are an Indigenous Australian people of North-eastern Victoria, in the state of Victoria, Australia. About 2,000 descendants exist in Australia in the early 21st century.

Name
The endonym Dhudhuroa has been analysed as being composed of the initial syllable dhu- of their word for "no" (dhubalga) and a form of the word for "mouth" (wurru).

Language
 
Dhudhuroa has been classified as belonging to the Gippsland branch of the Pama-Nyungan language family. Robert M. W. Dixon classifies it, with Pallanganmiddang, as one of the 2 languages comprising an Upper Murray Group. Lexicostatistical analysis however shows that it something of a language isolate within neighbouring languages, with which it shares no more than 11-16% of common vocabulary. It has various dialects, one being Ba Barwidgee.

The language is currently undergoing a revival, and is being taught at Bright Secondary College, Harrietville Primary School and Wooragee Primary School.

Country
The Dhudhuroa language is a language of north-eastern Victoria, existing from before European settlement. It includes Tallangatta and the Murray River Valley land from Jingellic and Tintaldra to Albury. Tindale's reconstruction of the scanty source evidence to arrive at this conclusion has been judged "poor" due to its over-reliance on a single source, that of A. W. Howitt, by R.M. Dixon.

 it is estimated that there are about 2000 descendants of Dhudhuroa, and there is a Dhudhuroa Native Title Group.

Social organization
The early Australian ethnographer Alfred Howitt categorized the Dhudhuroa as a horde of the Jaitmathang, an opinion shared by Aldo Massola in 1962. Linguistically however the vocabulary they used differed from that noted down from tribal informants of various hordes of the Jaitmattang.

Alternative names

Tindale
 Tharamirttong, Tharamittong
 Tharomattay
 Jeenong-metong  (strong-footed ones)
 Dyinning-middhang
 Ginning-matong
 Dhooroomba.( ?)
 Theddora mittung.  (hordal term)

AIATSIS
 Djiningmiddang tribe
 Yaithmathang
 Jaitmatang
 Duduroa
 Djilamatang
 Kandangora
 Omeo tribe
 Theddora
 Yaitmathang
 Dhudhruwa
 Dhuduroa
 Do
 dor
 dee
 Dodora
 Dodoro
 Toutourrite
 Theddora mittung
 Duduruwa
 Tharamirttong
 Tharamittong
 Tharo mattay
 Jeenong metong
 Dyinning middhang
 Ginning matong

Some words
 ngiyambanba (fire)
 geberri (bad)
 gundja (good)
 yambo (fish)
 bandjina (child)
 mema (father)
 baba (mother)
 wingga (dog)
 dalga (mountain)
 gumbarro (gum tree)

Notes

Citations

Sources

Aboriginal peoples of Victoria (Australia)
History of Victoria (Australia)